Katalin Csőke Tóthné (July 1, 1957 – August 10, 2017) was a female discus thrower, who competed for Hungary at the 1980 Summer Olympics. She was born in Fegyvernek, Jász-Nagykun-Szolnok. A member of Fegyvernek, Jász-Nagykun-Szolnok she set her personal best (63.20 metres) in 1980.

References
Katalin Csőke's profile at Sports Reference.com
Katalin Csőke's obituary 

1957 births
2017 deaths
Hungarian female discus throwers
Athletes (track and field) at the 1980 Summer Olympics
Olympic athletes of Hungary
Sportspeople from Jász-Nagykun-Szolnok County